The Penrose Historic District is a national historic district located at Arlington County, Virginia. It contains 486 contributing buildings, 2 contributing sites, and 2 contributing object in a residential neighborhood in South Arlington. The area was created with the integration of 12 distinct subdivisions platted between 1882 and 1943.  The dwelling styles include the late-19th and early-20th-century vernacular, Queen Anne, Italianate, and Colonial Revival farm dwellings.  A notable number of these dwellings are prefabricated kit or mail-order houses.

It was listed on the National Register of Historic Places in 2004.

References

Houses on the National Register of Historic Places in Virginia
Colonial Revival architecture in Virginia
Historic districts in Arlington County, Virginia
National Register of Historic Places in Arlington County, Virginia
Houses in Arlington County, Virginia
Historic districts on the National Register of Historic Places in Virginia